Dhrubganj is a gram panchayat of Kharik block in Bhagalpur district of Bihar state in India. It comes under the legislative assembly of Bihpur. Before the abolition of Zamindari system in India, this village was considered as a village of Zamindars. However, after the abolition of zamindari, most of the people lost their lands and now are small scale peasants.

Economy 
The main occupation of the villagers is farming. Banana, mango, lichi, wheat and maize are the main plants grown in the lands of this village. Basic facilities like electricity, road, and elementary school are available by efforts of the Government of India. But still many people live in mud houses who are unable to afford a pakka house. Because of lesser career opportunity in village, people are slowly migrating to metropolitan cities like Delhi, Kolkata, Bombay and likewise in search of better means of livelihood which accounts for the decline in village population in recent years.

The primary occupation of Muslims is to weave clothes in powerlooms. Many of the castes can still be seen to perform their traditional work. Barbers, carpenters, shoemakers and kaanu are such castes. With modern education, diversity is growing within the village and people are finding new means of livelihood like mobile repair shop, recharge point etc. apart from their traditional work.

Society and religion
There are many temples of Durga, Shiva, Kali, Sati and other Hindu deities out of which Nayi Durga Sthan is worth mentioning. There is also a masjid where Muslim residents offer their prayers. Temples are well decorated during festivals. Also, in every home prayers are offered to Gosain which they believe to be listened by their ancestors. Ancestors are invited as a ritual to attend all the major events in the household like marriage, mundana (first time hair cutting ceremony) and Upanayana. In addition to temples and gosain, they also worship Kalash during Durga Puja. The village also hosts Yajna every year in Nayi Durga Sthan which is attended by thousands of people from nearby villages.

Festivals
Festivals are of primary importance for all the villagers because it is the only time when they enjoy themselves by delicious meals and visiting village fairs. Main festival are Durga Puja and Chhath Puja. During Durga Puja, the two temples are well decorated and idol of Goddess Durga is established and worshipped for ten days before immersing the idol in nearby Kalbaliya stream. While in Chath puja, prayers are offered to Sun God. In addition to these main festivals many other festivals are part of their life which they perform with true devotion and in accordance with rituals.

References

Bihar Days

Villages in Bhagalpur district